Andres Langemets (born 9 March 1948 in Rapla) is an Estonian publicist, poet.

1980, he gave his signature to Letter of 40 intellectuals.

1988–1997, he was the chief editor of the magazine Looming.

In 2006, he was awarded with Order of the National Coat of Arms, IV class.

Works
 poetry collection "Omadus" (1981)
 poetry collection "Üleminekud" (1987)
 literary critics "Post librum. Kijandusmõtisklusi 1972–1987" (1992)
 prose and poetry "Lüroeepika" (1998)
 poem "Vooder" (2008)
 poetry anthology "Tagasisadu. Valik luuletusi 1965–2011" (2012)

References

Living people
1948 births
Estonian male poets
20th-century Estonian writers
21st-century Estonian writers
Estonian editors
Recipients of the Order of the National Coat of Arms, 4th Class
University of Tartu alumni
People from Rapla
Estonian magazine editors
Looming (magazine) editors